"Accommodation address" is a term used mostly in the United Kingdom to denote a location where mail can be delivered in the name of a person or business for retrieval.  The service is similar to poste restante and post office boxes, but is generally supplied by a private company, or even an individual.  The degree of service can range from full secretarial and telephone answering, to a simple mail drop.  Small businesses use accommodation addresses when they have no fixed place of business, and do not wish to use a post office box, a proper address giving an air of respectability.

Accommodation addresses are occasionally used to have goods delivered that have been paid for through credit card fraud.

See also
 Serviced office

References

Postal services